Kreis Samter was a district in Regierungsbezirk Posen, in the Prussian Province of Posen from 1818 to 1918. Its territory presently lies in the north-western part of Polish region of Greater Poland Voivodeship.

History 
The Samter district was formed on January 1, 1818, with its capital at Samter. As part of the Province of Posen, the Samter district became part of the newly founded German Empire on January 18, 1871.

On December 27, 1918, the Greater Poland uprising began in the province of Posen, and on the same day the district town of Samter came under Polish control. On February 16, 1919, an armistice ended the Polish-German fighting, and on June 28, 1919, the German government officially ceded the Samter district to the newly founded Poland with the signing of the Treaty of Versailles.

Elections 
In the German Empire, the district of Samter, together with the districts of Birnbaum, Obornik and Schwerin belonged to the Posen 2 Reichstag constituency. The constituency was won by the following candidates in the Reichstag elections:

 1871:  Ludwig von Rönne, National Liberal Party
 1874:  Ludwig Zietkiewicz, Polish Party
 1877:  Stephan von Kwilecki, Polish Party
 1878:  Stephan von Kwilecki, Polish Party
 1881:  Stephan von Kwilecki, Polish Party
 1884:  Stephan von Kwilecki, Polish Party
 1887:  Hector von Kwilecki, Polish Party
 1890:  Hector von Kwilecki, Polish Party
 1893:  Hector von Kwilecki, Polish Party
 1898:  Hector von Kwilecki, Polish Party
 1903:  Mathias von Brudzewo-Mielzynski, Polish Party
 1907:  Mathias von Brudzewo-Mielzynski, Polish Party (52.3% of the vote) 
 1912:  Mathias von Brudzewo-Mielzynski, Polish Party (52.7% of the vote)

Demographics 
The district had a majority Polish population, with a significant German minority.

Towns 
The five towns in the district were Obersitzko, Pinne, Samter, Scharfenort and Wronke.

References

Districts of the Province of Posen